Andrey Klimovich (born 27 August 1988) is a Belarusian professional footballer. He plays for Russian club Volga Ulyanovsk.

Club career
On 30 August 2019, he signed with the Russian Premier League club FC Orenburg.

International career
Klimovich was called up to the senior Belarus squad for a friendly against Republic of Ireland in May 2016. He earned his first cap on 12 June 2017, in the 1:0 win over New Zealand in another friendly match, playing the full 90 minutes.

Honours
Shakhtyor Soligorsk
Belarusian Cup winner: 2018–19

References

External links 
 
 
 

1988 births
Living people
Belarusian footballers
Association football goalkeepers
Belarus international footballers
FC Energetik-BGU Minsk players
FC Dinamo Minsk players
FC Baranovichi players
FC Veras Nesvizh players
FC Dynamo Brest players
FC Gomel players
FC Minsk players
FC Shakhtyor Soligorsk players
FC Orenburg players
FC Urozhay Krasnodar players
FC Volga Ulyanovsk players
Belarusian Premier League players
Belarusian First League players
Russian Premier League players
Russian First League players
Belarusian expatriate footballers
Expatriate footballers in Russia
Belarusian expatriate sportspeople in Russia